Manampuzha is a small place in Kunnathur Village Panchayat, in Kunnathur Taluk, Kollam district, Kerala, India.

Landmarks
There is a temple, a government primary school, an English medium convent school, a church etc. in this place.

Trikkanappuram Temple
The temple called "Manampuzha Trikkannapuram Mahadeva Temple" is a small famous which gets fame across the area these days. The festival will be conducted every year on 10th day of Medam. 'Pathamudayam'

References

Villages in Kollam district